Carlton Douglas Ridenhour (born August 1, 1960), known professionally as Chuck D, is an American rapper, best known as the leader and frontman of the hip hop group Public Enemy, which he co-founded in 1985 with Flavor Flav. Chuck D is also a member of the rock supergroup Prophets of Rage. He has released several solo albums, most notably Autobiography of Mistachuck (1996).

His work with Public Enemy helped create politically and socially conscious hip hop music in the mid-1980s. The Source ranked him at No. 12 on its list of the Top 50 Hip-Hop Lyricists of All Time. Chuck D has been nominated for six Grammys throughout his career, and has received the Grammy Lifetime Achievement Award as a member of Public Enemy. He was also inducted into the Rock and Roll Hall of Fame in 2013 as member of Public Enemy.

Early life
Ridenhour was born on August 1, 1960 on Long Island, New York. When he was a child, his mother played Motown and showtunes in the home and his father belonged to the Columbia Record Club. He began writing lyrics after the New York City blackout of 1977. He attended W. Tresper Clarke High School, where he was offered no formal education in music. He then went to Adelphi University on Long Island to study graphic design, where he met William Drayton (Flavor Flav). He received a Bachelor of Fine Arts from Adelphi in 1984 and later received an honorary doctorate from Adelphi in 2013.

While at Adelphi, Ridenhour co-hosted hip hop radio show the Super Spectrum Mix Hour as Chuck D on Saturday nights at Long Island rock radio station WLIR, designed flyers for local hip-hop events, and drew a cartoon called Tales of the Skind for Adelphi student newspaper The Delphian.

Career

Ridenhour (using the nickname Chuck D) formed Public Enemy in 1985 with Flavor Flav. Upon hearing Ridenhour's demo track "Public Enemy Number One", fledgling producer/upcoming music-mogul Rick Rubin insisted on signing him to his Def Jam Records. Their major label releases were Yo! Bum Rush the Show (1987), It Takes a Nation of Millions to Hold Us Back (1988), Fear of a Black Planet (1990), Apocalypse 91... The Enemy Strikes Black (1991), the compilation album Greatest Misses (1992), and Muse Sick-n-Hour Mess Age (1994). They also released a full-length album soundtrack for the film He Got Game in 1998.

Ridenhour also contributed (as Chuck D) to several episodes of the documentary series The Blues. He has appeared as a featured artist on many other songs and albums, having collaborated with artists such as Janet Jackson, Kool Moe Dee, The Dope Poet Society, Run–D.M.C., Ice Cube, Boom Boom Satellites, Rage Against the Machine, Anthrax, John Mellencamp and many others. In 1990, he appeared on "Kool Thing", a song by the alternative rock band Sonic Youth, and along with Flavor Flav, he sang on George Clinton's song "Tweakin'", which appears on his 1989 album The Cinderella Theory. In 1993, he was the executive producer for Got 'Em Running Scared, an album by Ichiban Records group Chief Groovy Loo and the Chosen Tribe.

Later career
In 1996, Ridenhour released Autobiography of Mistachuck on Mercury Records. Chuck D made a rare appearance at the 1998 MTV Video Music Awards, presenting the Video Vanguard Award to the Beastie Boys, commending their musicianship. In November 1998, he settled out of court with Christopher "The Notorious B.I.G." Wallace's estate over the latter's sampling of his voice in the song "Ten Crack Commandments". The specific sampling is Ridenhour counting off the numbers one to nine on the track "Shut 'Em Down". He later described the decision to sue as "stupid".

In September 1999, he launched a multi-format "supersite" on the web site Rapstation.com. The site includes a TV and radio station with original programming, prominent hip hop DJs, celebrity interviews, free MP3 downloads (the first was contributed by rapper Coolio), downloadable ringtones by ToneThis, social commentary, current events, and regular features on turning rap careers into a viable living. Since 2000, he has been one of the most vocal supporters of peer-to-peer file sharing in the music industry.

He loaned his voice to Grand Theft Auto: San Andreas as DJ Forth Right MC for the radio station Playback FM. In 2000, he collaborated with Public Enemy's Gary G-Whiz and MC Lyte on the theme music to the television show Dark Angel. He appeared with Henry Rollins in a cover of Black Flag's "Rise Above" for the album Rise Above: 24 Black Flag Songs to Benefit the West Memphis Three. In 2003, he was featured in the PBS documentary Godfathers and Sons in which he recorded a version of Muddy Waters' song "Mannish Boy" with Common, Electrik Mud Cats, and Kyle Jason. He was also featured on Z-Trip's album Shifting Gears on a track called "Shock and Awe"; a 12-inch of the track was released featuring artwork by Shepard Fairey. In 2008 he contributed a chapter to Sound Unbound: Sampling Digital Music and Culture (The MIT Press, 2008) edited by Paul D. Miller a.k.a. DJ Spooky, and also turned up on The Go! Team's album Proof of Youth on the track "Flashlight Fight." He also fulfilled his childhood dreams of being a sports announcer by performing the play-by-play commentary in the video game NBA Ballers: Chosen One on Xbox 360 and PlayStation 3.

In 2009, Ridenhour wrote the foreword to the book The Love Ethic: The Reason Why You Can't Find and Keep Beautiful Black Love by Kamau and Akilah Butler. He also appeared on Brother Ali's album Us.

In March 2011, Chuck D re-recorded vocals with The Dillinger Escape Plan for a cover of "Fight the Power".
 
Chuck D duetted with Rock singer Meat Loaf on his 2011 album Hell in a Handbasket on the song "Mad Mad World/The Good God Is a Woman and She Don't Like Ugly".

In 2016 Chuck D joined the band Prophets of Rage along with B-Real and former members of Rage Against the Machine.

In July 2019, Ridenhour sued Terrordome Music Publishing and Reach Music Publishing for $1 million for withholding royalties.

In 2023, Chuck D released a four-part documentary on PBS entitled "Fight the Power: How Hip Hop Changed the World."

Rapping technique and creative process

Chuck D is known for his powerful rapping. How to Rap says he "has a powerful, resonant voice that is often acclaimed as one of the most distinct and impressive in hip-hop". Chuck says this was based on listening to Melle Mel and sportscasters such as Marv Albert.

Chuck often comes up with a title for a song first. He writes on paper, though sometimes edits using a computer. He prefers to not punch in or overdub vocals.

Chuck listed his favourite rap albums in Hip Hop Connection:

 N.W.A, Straight Outta Compton 
 Boogie Down Productions, Criminal Minded 
 Run-DMC, Tougher Than Leather 
 Big Daddy Kane, Looks Like a Job For... 
 Stetsasonic, In Full Gear
 Ice Cube, AmeriKKKa's Most Wanted

 Dr. Dre, The Chronic 
 De La Soul, 3 Feet High and Rising 
 Eric B. & Rakim, Follow the Leader 
 Run-DMC, Raising Hell ("It was the first record that made me realise this was an album-oriented genre")

Politics
Chuck D identifies as Black, as opposed to African or African-American. In a 1993 issue of DIRT Magazine covering a taping of In the Mix hosted by Alimi Ballard at the Apollo, Dan Field writes, At one point, Chuck bristles a bit at the term "African-American." He thinks of himself as Black and sees nothing wrong with the term. Besides, he says, having been born in the United States and lived his whole life here, he doesn't consider himself African. Being in Public Enemy has given him the chance to travel around the world, an experience that really opened his eyes and his mind. He says visiting Africa and experiencing life on a continent where the majority of people are Black gave him a new perspective and helped him get in touch with his own history. He also credits a trip to the ancient Egyptian pyramids at Giza with helping him appreciate the relative smallness of man.
Ridenhour is politically active; he co-hosted Unfiltered on Air America Radio, testified before the United States Congress in support of peer-to-peer MP3 sharing, and was involved in a 2004 rap political convention. He has continued to be an activist, publisher, lecturer, and producer.

Addressing the negative views associated with rap music, he co-wrote the essay book Fight the Power: Rap, Race, and Reality with Yusuf Jah. He argues that "music and art and culture is escapism, and escapism sometimes is healthy for people to get away from reality", but sometimes the distinction is blurred and that's when "things could lead a young mind in a direction." He also founded the record company Slam Jamz and acted as narrator in Kareem Adouard's short film Bling: Consequences and Repercussions, which examines the role of conflict diamonds in bling fashion. Despite Chuck D and Public Enemy's success, Chuck D claims that popularity or public approval was never a driving motivation behind their work. He is admittedly skeptical of celebrity status, revealing in a 1999 interview with BOMB Magazine that "The key for the record companies is to just keep making more and more stars, and make the ones who actually challenge our way of life irrelevant. The creation of celebrity has clouded the minds of most people in America, Europe and Asia. It gets people off the path they need to be on as individuals."

In an interview with Le Monde, published January 29, 2008, Chuck D stated that rap is devolving so much into a commercial enterprise, that the relationship between the rapper and the record label is that of slave to a master. He believes that nothing has changed for African-Americans since the debut of Public Enemy and, although he thinks that an Obama-Clinton alliance is great, he does not feel that the establishment will allow anything of substance to be accomplished. He stated that French President Nicolas Sarkozy is like any other European elite: he has profited through the murder, rape, and pillaging of those less fortunate and he refuses to allow equal opportunity for those men and women from Africa. In this article, he defended a comment made by Professor Griff in the past that he says was taken out of context by the media. The real statement was a critique of the Israeli government and its treatment of the Palestinian people. Chuck D stated that it is Public Enemy's belief that all human beings are equal.

In an interview with the magazine N'Digo published in June 2008, he spoke of today's mainstream urban music seemingly relishing the addictive euphoria of materialism and sexism, perhaps being the primary cause of many people harboring resentment towards the genre and its future. However, he has expressed hope for its resurrection, saying "It's only going to be dead if it doesn't talk about the messages of life as much as the messages of death and non-movement", citing artists such as NYOil, M.I.A. and The Roots as socially conscious artists who push the envelope creatively. "A lot of cats are out there doing it, on the Web and all over. They're just not placing their career in the hands of some major corporation."

In 2010, Chuck D released the track "Tear Down That Wall." He said "I talked about the wall not only just dividing the U.S. and Mexico but the states of California, New Mexico and Texas. But Arizona, it's like, come on. Now they're going to enforce a law that talks about basically racial profiling."

He is on the board of the TransAfrica Forum, a Pan African organization that is focused on African, Caribbean and Latin American issues.

He has been an activist with projects of The Revcoms, such as Refuse Fascism and Stop Mass Incarceration Network. Carl Dix interviewed Chuck D on The Revcoms' YouTube program The RNL – Revolution, Nothing Less! – Show.

In 2022, he endorsed Conrad Tillard, formerly the Nation of Islam Minister known as Conrad Muhammad and subsequently a Baptist Minister, in his campaign for New York State Senate in District 25 (covering part of eastern and north-central Brooklyn).

Personal life
Chuck D has claimed on Twitter to be a maternal great grandson of architect George Washington Foster.

As of December 2019, he had at least two children.

Chuck D lives in California and lost his home in the Thomas Fire that occurred from December 2017 to January 2018.

TV appearances
 Narrated and appeared on-camera for the 2005 PBS documentary Harlem Globetrotters: The Team That Changed the World.
 Appeared on-camera for the PBS program Independent Lens: Hip-Hop: Beyond Beats and Rhymes.
 Appeared in an episode of NewsRadio as himself.
 He appeared on The Henry Rollins Show.
 He was a featured panelist (with Lars Ulrich) on the May 12, 2000 episode of the Charlie Rose show. Host Charlie Rose was discussing the Internet, copyright infringement, Napster Inc., and the future of the music industry.
 He appeared on an episode of Space Ghost Coast to Coast with Pat Boone. While there, Space Ghost tried (and failed) to show he was "hip" to rap, saying his favorite rapper was M. C. Escher.
 He appeared on an episode of Johnny Bravo.
 He appeared via satellite to the UK, as a panelist on BBC's Newsnight on January 20, 2009, following Barack Obama's Inauguration.
 He appeared on a Christmas episode of Adult Swim's Aqua Teen Hunger Force.
 He Appeared on VH1 Ultimate Albums Blood Sugar Sex Magik talking about the Red Hot Chili Peppers.
 He appeared on Foo Fighters: Sonic Highways in the episode talking about the beginnings of the hip-hop scene in New York City

Music appearances
In 1990, Chuck featured on Sonic Youth single Kool Thing.
In 1993, Chuck rapped on "New Agenda" from Janet Jackson's janet. "I loved his work, but I'd never met him," said Jackson. "I called Chuck up and told him how much I admired their work. When I hear Chuck, it's like I'm hearing someone teaching, talking to a whole bunch of people. And instead of just having the rap in the bridge, as usual, I wanted him to do stuff all the way through. I sent him a tape. He said he loved the song, but he was afraid he was going to mess it up. I said 'Are you kidding?'"
In 1999, Chuck D appeared on Prince's hit "Undisputed" on the album Rave Un2 the Joy Fantastic.
In 2001, Chuck D appeared on the Japanese electronic duo Boom Boom Satellites track "Your Reality's a Fantasy but Your Fantasy Is Killing Me" on the album Umbra.
In 2001, Chuck D provided vocals for Public Domain's Rock Da Funky Beats.
In 2010, Chuck D made an appearance on the track "Transformação" (Portuguese for "Transformation") from Brazilian rapper MV Bill's album Causa E Efeito (meaning Cause and Effect).
In 2003 he was featured on the track "Access to the Excess" in Junkie XL's album Radio JXL: A Broadcast from the Computer Hell Cabin.
In 2011 Chuck D made an appearance on the track "Mad Mad World/The Good God Is a Woman and She Don't Like Ugly" from Meat Loaf's 2011 album Hell in a Handbasket.
In 2013, he has appeared in Mat Zo's single "Pyramid Scheme".
In 2013 he performed at the Rock and Roll Hall of Fame Music Masters concert tribute to The Rolling Stones.
In 2014 he performed with Jahi on "People Get Ready" and "Yo!" from the first album by Public Enemy spin-off project PE 2.0.
In 2016 he appeared in ASAP Ferg's album "Always Strive and Prosper" on the track "Beautiful People".
In 2017 he was featured on the track "America" on Logic's album "Everybody".
In 2019, he appeared on "Story of Everything", a song on Threads, an album by Sheryl Crow. The track also features Andra Day and Gary Clark Jr.

Discography

with Public Enemy

Studio albums
 Yo! Bum Rush the Show (1987)
 It Takes a Nation of Millions to Hold Us Back (1988)
 Fear of a Black Planet (1990)
 Apocalypse 91... The Enemy Strikes Black (1991)
 Muse Sick-n-Hour Mess Age (1994)
 He Got Game (1998)
 There's a Poison Goin' On (1999)
 Revolverlution (2002)
 New Whirl Odor (2005)
 How You Sell Soul to a Soulless People Who Sold Their Soul? (2007)
 Most of My Heroes Still Don't Appear on No Stamp (2012)
 The Evil Empire of Everything (2012)
 Man Plans God Laughs (2015)
 Nothing Is Quick in the Desert (2017)
 What You Gonna Do When the Grid Goes Down? (2020)

with Confrontation Camp
Studio albums
Objects in the Mirror Are Closer Than They Appear (2001)

with Prophets of Rage
Studio albums
 Prophets of Rage (2017)

Studio EPs
 The Party's Over (2016)

Solo
Studio albums
 Autobiography of Mistachuck (1996)
 The Black in Man (2014)
 If I Can't Change the People Around Me I Change the People Around Me (2016)
 Celebration of Ignorance (2018)

Compilation albums
 Action (DJ Matheos Worldwide International Remix) - Most*hifi (featuring Chuck D. and Huggy) (2010)
 Don't Rhyme for the Sake of Riddlin' (as Mistachuck) (2012)

References

Other sources

Selected publications

External links

Public Enemy website

1960 births
Living people
Adelphi University alumni
American talk radio hosts
African-American male rappers
African-American male singers
American male singers
African-American television producers
Television producers from New York (state)
Mercury Records artists
Musicians from Queens, New York
Singers from New York (state)
People from Roosevelt, New York
Public Enemy (band) members
Rappers from New York (state)
Prophets of Rage members
Rap metal musicians
21st-century American rappers